Taniwha Cove is a U-shaped cove within Couzens Bay, Antarctica, at the northeastern end of the Churchill Mountains. Its entrance is bounded at the east by Senia Point and Mount Tadpole rises above its western shores. Taniwha is the Maori word for a creature/monster of the deep, often used mythologically.

References

Coves of Antarctica
Bodies of water of the Ross Dependency
Shackleton Coast